Karim Haseleh-ye Olya (also Romanized as Karīm Ḩāşeleh-ye ‘Olyā) is a village in Hasanabad Rural District, in the Central District of Eslamabad-e Gharb County, Kermanshah Province, Iran. At the 2006 census, its population was 22, in 6 families.

References 

Populated places in Eslamabad-e Gharb County